Thiruvaiyathukudi is a village in the Papanasam taluk of Thanjavur district, Tamil Nadu, India.

Demographics 

As per the 2001 census Thiruvaiyathukudi had a total population of 1636 with 795 males and 841 females. The sex ratio was 1058. The literacy rate was 66.71.

References 

 

Villages in Thanjavur district